Ferry Fryston is a suburb of the town of Castleford in West Yorkshire, England. It is situated in the metropolitan borough of the City of Wakefield. The appropriate ward is called Airedale and Ferry Fryston.

In the 18th century Ferry Fryston was a township and civil parish in the district of Pontefract. Water-Frystone, Wheldale, and Ferrybridge were hamlets within the parish.

Coal mines existed within the boundaries of the former parish in New Fryston, locally known as Fryston Pit, and in Wheldale. The former closed in 1985. The area where the mine once stood has now been re-developed. Wakefield Metropolitan District Council approved plans in November 2007 for 150 new dwellings, parkland and public open space. The dwellings have still yet to be built. Wheldale colliery closed in 1987. Its buildings above ground have been demolished. The areas of both collieries have been subject to land remediation work.

Most homes in the area were homes of local miners. Local authority housing was transferred in 2005 to a charitable community benefit organisation, Wakefield District Housing.

References

Geography of the City of Wakefield
Castleford